New Zealand competed at the 1952 Winter Olympics in Oslo, Norway.  It was the first time that the nation had competed at the Winter Olympic Games.  The country was represented by its skiing team, captained by Sir Roy McKenzie, who was injured and did not compete.

Team members were skiers Annette Johnson who came 30th in the Giant Slalom (3-0.66), the best result of the team; Herbert (Herbie) Familton (finished 65th in downhill, 77th in Giant Slalom); Bill Hunt (finished 81st in Giant Slalom); instructor Herbert Modelhart; and Austin Haywood the team Assistant Manager who was the flagbearer at the opening ceremony. No medals were earned.

Alpine skiing

Men

Women

References 
 

NZARE page with biography of Roy McKenzie
 Olympic Winter Games 1952, full results by sports-reference.com

Nations at the 1952 Winter Olympics
1952
Winter Olympics